Landkreis Leobschütz (Leobschütz district) was a Prussian district in Silesia, from 1743 to 1945, with its capital at Leobschütz. Its historical roots lie in the Duchy of Leobschütz.

History 
After most of Silesia fell under Prussian rule, King Frederick the Great introduced Prussian administrative structures in Lower Silesia in 1742 and in Upper Silesia in 1743. In the course of the Prussian Reform Movement, the district of Leobschütz was assigned to Regierungsbezirk Oppeln in the Province of Silesia.

During the district reform of 1 January 1818 in Regierungsbezirk Oppeln, the district boundaries were changed as follows:

 The villages of Berndau, Damasko, Gläsen, Kasimir, Schönau, Steubendorf and Thomnitz moved from the Neustadt district to the Leobschütz district.
 The city of Hultschin, the areas of Beneschau and Zauditz and the villages of Autoschowitz, Benenschau, Bielau, Bobrownick, Bolatitz, Boleslau, Boratin, Buslawitz, Chlebsch, Cosmütz, Deutsch Krawarn, Ellgoth, Groß Darkowitz, Groß Hoschütz, Groß Peterwitz, Halsch, Henneberg, Hoschialkowitz, Kauthen, Klein Darkowitz, Klein Hoschütz, Klein Peterwitz, Koblau, Köberwitz, Kranowitz, Kuchelna, Langendorf, Ludgerzowitz, Marquartowitz, Odersch, Owschütz, Peterzkowitz, Pyscha, Ratsch, Rohow, Schammerwitz, Schlausewitz, Schreibersdorf, Schillersdorf, Sczepankowitz, Strandorf, Thröm, Wrbkau, Wrzesin, Zabrzeg and Zawada moved from the Leobschütz district to the Ratibor district.

On 8 November 1919 the province of Silesia was dissolved. The new Province of Upper Silesia was formed from Regierungsbezirk Oppeln. In the Upper Silesia plebiscite held on 20 March 1921, 99.6% of the voters in the Leobschütz district voted for Germany and 0.4% voted for Poland. Consequently, the district remained in Germany in the interwar period. On 1 April 1938 the provinces of Lower Silesia and Upper Silesia were merged to form the Province of Silesia. On 18 January 1941, the province of Silesia was dissolved again and the province of Upper Silesia was formed, including territories annexed from Poland. In the spring of 1945, the Red Army captured the district and placed it under Polish administration, after which the German population of the district was expelled.

Demographics 
The district had a majority German population, with significant Czech and Polish minorities.

Place Names 
In 1936, several communities in the Leobschütz district were renamed:

 Badewitz → Badenau
 Boblowitz → Hedwigsgrund
 Dirschkowitz → Dirschkowitz
 Hratschein → Burgfeld
 Jakubowitz → Jakobsfelde
 Kittelwitz → Kitteldorf
 Osterwitz → Osterdorf
 Peterwitz → Zietenbusch
 Thomnitz → Thomas
 Tschirmke → Schirmke
 Waissak → Lindau
 Wanowitz → Hubertusruh
 Wehowitz → Wehen
 Zauchwitz → Dreimühlen
 Zülkowitz → Zinnatal

References 

1945 disestablishments
1743 establishments
Głubczyce County
Leobschütz